The Boston Theater Critics Association is an organization of professional theater critics in the greater Boston area who volunteer to sponsor and bestow the Elliot Norton Awards. For the 2011 awards, the panel included Boston Globe chief theater critic Don Aucoin;  WGBH-TV reporter Jared Bowen;  is an Emmy-winning reporter with WGBH-TV; former Boston Herald chief theater critic Terry Byrne; Boston Phoenix chief drama critic Carolyn Clay; former Boston Herald theater critic Iris Fanger; former  WBZ-TV entertainment critic Joyce Kulhawik; and former Boston Globe theater critic Ed Siegel.

External links
Boston Theater Critics Association official web site

American theater awards